= Mary Ann Ottinger =

American scientist

- Ottinger at a 2007 Gordon Cain Conference
- Alma mater: University of Maryland, College Park
- Scientific career
- Thesis: The relationship of testosterone, sex-related behavior and morphology during the sexual maturation of the male Japanese quail (1977)

Mary Ann Ottinger is an American biochemistry researcher, and academic. She is associate vice chancellor for research at the University of Houston.

She was elected a fellow of the American Association for the Advancement of Science in 2014.

== Education and career ==
She graduated from University of Maryland. She taught at University of Maryland and University of Houston.

She was a member of a National Academies workshop.

== Works ==
- Malecki, Kristen M. C.; Andersen, Julie K.; Geller, Andrew M.; Harry, G. Jean; Jackson, Chandra L.; James, Katherine A.; Miller, Gary W.; Ottinger, Mary Ann (2022-02-21). "Integrating Environment and Aging Research: Opportunities for Synergy and Acceleration". Frontiers in Aging Neuroscience. 14. doi:10.3389/fnagi.2022.824921. ISSN 1663-4365. PMC 8901047. PMID 35264945.
- Kritzell, Camryn; Ottinger, Mary Ann; Albecker, Molly (2026-05-26). "The importance of integrating evolutionary–developmental perspectives into One Health approaches". BioScience. doi:10.1093/biosci/biag067. ISSN 0006-3568.
